Frances Mackenzie, Countess of Seaforth (née Herbert; 165918 December 1732), was a Welsh-born Scottish noblewoman and wife of Kenneth Mackenzie, 4th Earl of Seaforth.

Biography

Early life and family
The daughter of William Herbert, 1st Marquess of Powis, and his wife, Lady Elizabeth Somerset, Frances was born into a Roman Catholic Jacobite family. She had one brother, William, and four sisters: Mary, Anne, Lucy and Winifred. Her family played an active part in the various Jacobite risings throughout the late 17th and early 18th centuries; her father personally helped Mary of Modena and James, Prince of Wales escape after the Glorious Revolution of 1688; and her sister Winifred's husband William Maxwell, 5th Earl of Nithsdale was captured at Preston together with other Jacobite leaders, found guilty of treason and sentenced to death. Winifred famously helped him escape from the Tower of London in 1715.

Marriage and children
Frances married a fellow Jacobite in 1680, the Scottish Kenneth Mackenzie, 4th Earl of Seaforth. The Mackenzies had four children: William, Mary, Alicia and Alexander. Ten years into their marriage, Kenneth was sent off to head a rising in Scotland. He was captured and imprisoned, however. He was released in 1697 and the family fled to Paris, where he died in January 1701.

Later years and death
After her husband's death, she remained in Paris, and died there on 18 December 1732, aged 73.

Children

Ancestry

References

1659 births
1732 deaths
17th-century Scottish women
18th-century Scottish women
Frances
Daughters of British marquesses
Wives of knights
English Jacobites
Frances
Scottish countesses